Metamorfosi is a suburb of Athens, Greece.

Metamorfosi may also refer to:

Places in Greece
 Metamorfosi, Chalkidiki, a village in the municipal unit Chalkidiki in Polygyros
 Metamorfosi, Kilkis, a village in the municipal unit Kilkis in Polykastro
 Metamorfosi, Kozani, a municipal department of the city of Kozani
 Metamorfosi, Laconia, a village in Laconia
 Metamorfosi Sotiros, a neighbourhood of the city of Patras
 Metamorfosi, Kastoria, a village in the municipal unit Vitsi in Kastoria

Music
 Metamorfosi (band), an Italian symphonic rock band
 Metamorfosi (album), Italian singer Noemi's sixth studio album, released in 2021

See also
 Metamorphosis (disambiguation)
 Metamorphoses (disambiguation)
 Metamorfosis (disambiguation)